Together in Concert: Live is a 2000 live album by Tim Finn, Bic Runga, and Dave Dobbyn during their Together in Concert tour. It was recorded in the months of August and September 2000 in venues around New Zealand. Both the concert and album feature all three performers providing vocal and instrumental backing on each other's songs.

The album reached No. 2 on the New Zealand charts and remained in the charts for 26 weeks.

It was released in the UK on 29 May 2007. On iTunes, Tim Finn's name was erroneously credited as "Tim Funn"; however, this has since been corrected.

Track listing

Charts

Weekly charts

Year-end charts

Certifications

Personnel
 Tim Finn – vocals, acoustic guitar, congas, drums, flute, piano
 Bic Runga – vocals, acoustic guitar, congas, drums, electric guitar, percussion, Wurlitzer
 Dave Dobbyn – vocals, acoustic guitar, electric guitar, piano, slide guitar
 Wayne Bell – drums, congas
 Mark Hughes – bass
 Andrew Thorne – electric guitar

References

2000 live albums
Bic Runga albums
Dave Dobbyn albums
Tim Finn albums